The Apadana hoard is a hoard of coins that were discovered under the stone boxes containing the foundation tablets of the Apadana Palace in Persepolis. The coins were discovered in excavations in 1933 by Erich Schmidt, in two deposits, each deposit under the two deposition boxes that were found. The deposition of this hoard, which was visibly part of the foundation ritual of the Apadana, is dated to circa 515 BCE.

Foundation tablets
The gold and silver tablets retrieved from the stone boxes contained a trilingual inscription by Darius in Old Persian, Elamite and Akkadian, which describes his Empire in broad geographical terms, and is known as the DPh inscription:

Foundation hoard
The coins found in the hoard were:

 Northeastern deposit: Four gold lightweight Croeseids (Sardis mint), a tetradrachm of Abdera, a stater of Aegina.
 Southeastern deposit: Four gold lightweight Croeseids (Sardis mint), three double-sigloi from Cyprus (one attributed to Lapethus, one to Paphos, and one to an uncertain mint).

The Croesids were found in very fresh condition, confirming that they had been recently minted under Achaemenid rule. The deposit did not have any Darics and Sigloi, which also suggests strongly that these coins typical of Achaemenid coinage only started to be minted later, after 515 BCE.

Symbolism
According to numismat Martin Price, the coins in the hoard were probably selected not for the location they represented, but for the symbolic significance of their type. The lion attacking the bull in the Lycian coinage of the Croeseids had obvious symbolism for the Achaemenids, the griffin on the coin of Abdera may have been used as the symbolic guardian of gold, and the turtle of the coin from Aegina may have been chosen as a symbol of maritime power.

Other coin types of the Apadana hoard

See also

Ancient Greek coinage
Achaemenid coinage
Kabul hoard
Ghazzat hoard

References

Archaeology of the Achaemenid Empire
Treasure troves of classical antiquity
Archaeological discoveries in Iran
1933 in Iran
1933 archaeological discoveries